Harris County is a county located in the west-central portion of the U.S. state of Georgia; its western border with the state of Alabama is formed by the Chattahoochee River. As of the 2020 census, the population was 34,668. The county seat is Hamilton. The largest city in the county is Pine Mountain, a resort town that is home to the Franklin D. Roosevelt State Park (the largest state park in Georgia). Harris County was created on December 14, 1827, and named for Charles Harris, a Georgia judge and attorney. 

Harris County is part of the Columbus, GA-AL metropolitan area and has become a popular suburban and exurban destination of residence for families relocating from Columbus. Because of this, Harris has become the sixth-wealthiest county in Georgia in terms of per capita income and the wealthiest in the state outside of Metro Atlanta.

History

The county was settled by European Americans largely after the federal government had removed the indigenous Creek people (Muscogee) in the 1830s, under treaties by which they ceded most of their homelands to the United States. They were relocated to Indian Territory west of the Mississippi River. 

In the antebellum era, parts of the county were developed for cotton plantations, the premier commodity crop. Planters acquired numerous enslaved African Americans as laborers from the Upper South through the domestic slave trade.

The County Courthouse was designed by Edward Columbus Hosford of Georgia and completed in 1906.

Moonshiners were active in the mountain areas of the county in the late 19th and early 20th centuries. Both  whites and blacks took part in this, and were common drinking patrons.

Lynchings
On January 22, 1912, a black woman and three black men were lynched in Hamilton, the county seat, for the alleged murder of young local white landowner Norman Hadley. He was described by journalist Karen Branan in her 2016 book about these events as a white, "near penniless plowboy-playboy" and "notorious predator of black women."

Of this group, Dusky Crutchfield was the first woman lynched in Georgia. The lynching case attracted attention of national northern newspapers. Also murdered by the lynch mob were Eugene Harrington, Burrell Hardaway, and Johnie Moore. (Note: There was confusion about the names of victims at the time, and variations in spelling have been published.)

The four had been taken in for questioning about Hadley's murder by Sheriff Marion Madison "Buddie" Hadley, but never arrested. Lynched as scapegoats by a white mob of 100 men, they were later shown to have been utterly innocent. As an example of the complex relationships in the town and county, Johnie Moore was a mixed-race cousin of the sheriff; and Norman Hadley was the sheriff's nephew.

In 1947, prosperous farmer Henry "Peg" Gilbert, a married African-American man who owned and farmed 100 acres in Troup County, was arrested by officials from neighboring Harris County and charged with harboring a fugitive. The 47-year-old father was accused in the case of Gus Davidson, an African-American man accused of fatally shooting a white man in Harris County and who had disappeared. Four days later Gilbert was dead, shot while held in jail by the Harris County Sheriff, who said it was self-defense. No charges were filed against him. 

In 2016 the Civil Rights and Restorative Justice Project of Northeastern University reported on GGilbert's death in custody. They had found that Henry Gilbert had been beaten severely before his death, and shot five times. They asserted he had been detained and killed because whites resented his success as a farmer. Economic issues and competition were often at the bottom of lynchings. A white man took over Gilbert's land, cheating his family out of everything he had built.

Geography

The county is located in the Piedmont region of the state, with forests, farmland, and rolling hills covering much of the county. The Pine Mountain Range begins in the county, and runs across the northernmost parts of the county, with the highest point on the range found at Dowdell's Knob near the Meriwether County line.

The majority of Harris County is located in the middle Chattahoochee River–Lake Harding subbasin of the ACF River Basin (Apalachicola–Chattahoochee–Flint River Basin), with the exception of the county's southeastern border area, south of Ellerslie, which is located in the middle Chattahoochee River–Walter F. George Lake subbasin of the same ACF River Basin as that part of the county is drained by Bull Creek, which flows into Upatoi Creek south of Columbus.

Lake Harding and Goat Rock Lake both form much of the county’s western border along the Chattahoochee, and both are very popular recreational destinations, especially for metro Columbus residents.

Major highways

  Interstate 85
  Interstate 185
  U.S. Route 27
  U.S. Route 27 Alternate
  State Route 1
  State Route 18
  State Route 36
  State Route 85
  State Route 85 Alternate
  State Route 103
  State Route 116
  State Route 190
  State Route 208
  State Route 219
  State Route 315
  State Route 354
  State Route 403 (unsigned designation for I-85)
  State Route 411 (unsigned designation for I-185)

Adjacent counties
 Troup County (north)
 Meriwether County (northeast)
 Talbot County (east)
 Muscogee County (south)
 Lee County, Alabama (southwest/CST border)
 Chambers County, Alabama (northwest/CST border except Lanett and Valley as the cities are jointed by the Columbus metropolitan area)

Demographics

2020 census

As of the 2020 United States census, there were 34,668 people, 12,156 households, and 9,581 families residing in the county.

2010 census
As of the 2010 United States Census, there were 32,024 people, 11,823 households, and 9,268 families residing in the county. The racial makeup of the county was 79.3% white, 17.2% black or African American, 0.9% Asian, 0.3% American Indian, 0.1% Pacific islander, 0.7% from other races, and 1.5% from two or more races. Those of Hispanic or Latino origin made up 2.7% of the population. In terms of ancestry, 17.2% identified as having African ancestry; 13.5% were German, 13.4% were Irish, 11.5% were English, and 10.5% identified as having American ancestry.

Of the 11,823 households, 35.8% had children under the age of 18 living with them, 64.0% were married couples living together, 10.3% had a female householder with no husband present, 21.6% were non-families, and 18.5% of all households were made up of individuals. The average household size was 2.67 and the average family size was 3.04. The median age was 42.0 years.

The median income for a household in the county was $67,018 and the median income for a family was $74,457. Males had a median income of $49,844 versus $37,103 for females. The per capita income for the county was $31,073. About 6.0% of families and 9.0% of the population were below the poverty line, including 9.3% of those under age 18 and 10.5% of those age 65 or over.

Communities

Cities
 Hamilton (county seat)
 Shiloh
 West Point (part, most of city is in Troup County)

Towns
 Pine Mountain
 Waverly Hall

Unincorporated communities

 Cataula
 Ellerslie
 Fortson (part, mostly in Muscogee County)
 Midland (part, mostly in Muscogee County)
 Mountain Hill
 Ossahatchie
 Pine Mountain Valley
 Piney Grove
 Ridgeway
 Whitesville

Politics
Like all of Georgia except the Unionist Fannin, Towns, Pickens and Gilmer counties, which were in the upland region and could not support plantations, Harris County was historically dominated by a majority of conservative white voters after the Civil War. They belonged to the Democratic Party. From the end of Reconstruction to 1980, they supported Republican presidential candidates only twice, in 1964 (when Barry Goldwater carried the state in a landslide) and 1972 (during Richard Nixon's national landslide). 

But the passage of civil rights legislation by the national Democratic Party and social and cultural disruption of the era resulted in white conservatives beginning to support the Republican Party. In 1984, the state swung from having given a 16.8 percent victory to the 'favorite son' of Georgia, Jimmy Carter, in 1976, to a nearly 20-point victory for Ronald Reagan in his second term. In this, it was part of the realignment of white conservatives across the South. Since then, these voters in Harris County have voted for Republican presidential candidates. 1984 is the last time that a Democrat gained more than 40 percent of the vote. This trend has been attributed to the effect of Columbus's suburbs extending into the county, but it is part of the broader realignment among conservatives in the region.

Education
The Harris County School District holds preschool to grade 12 and consists of four elementary schools, an intermediate school, a middle school, and a high school. The district headquarters is located in Hamilton, and has 274 full-time teachers and over 4,411 students spread out over seven schools.
 Mulberry Creek Elementary School (Cataula)
 New Mountain Hill Elementary School (Fortson)
 Park Elementary School (Hamilton)
 Pine Ridge Elementary School (Ellerslie)
 Creekside Intermediate School (grades 5–6) (Cataula)
 Harris County Carver Middle School (Hamilton)
 Harris County High School (Hamilton)

Notable people
 Reuben J. Crews, father of C.C. Crews and a colonel in the Georgia Militia
 Benjamin Franklin White, clerk of the Inferior Court of Harris County, mayor of Whitesville, and compiler of the shape note songbook known as The Sacred Harp

See also

 National Register of Historic Places listings in Harris County, Georgia
List of counties in Georgia

References

External links

 Columbus Enquirer Archive Digital Library of Georgia
 Harris County historical marker

 
Georgia (U.S. state) counties
Columbus metropolitan area, Georgia
1827 establishments in Georgia (U.S. state)
Populated places established in 1827